The 1983 Friuli-Venezia Giulia regional election took place on 26 June 1983.

Events
Christian Democracy was by far the largest party, largely ahead of the Italian Communist Party which came second. After the election Antonio Comelli, the incumbent Christian Democratic President, formed a government with the Italian Socialist Party, the Italian Democratic Socialist Party, the Italian Republican Party and the Italian Liberal Party (Pentapartito). In 1984 Comelli was replaced by fellow Christian Democrat Adriano Biasutti.

Results
Sources: Istituto Cattaneo and Cjargne Online

References

Elections in Friuli-Venezia Giulia
1983 elections in Italy
June 1983 events in Europe